Athens District High School or A.D.H.S is a high school under the Upper Canada District School Board. The school is in the small town of Athens, Ontario, Canada.
Its website lists many achievements, including winning awards and media competitions, pioneering new systems of education and taking part in extracurricular courses and international student exchanges. The high school has less than 250 students as of 2009/2010.

The school has a student parliament system in which it takes great pride and encourages students to be involved every year. The parliament consists of two parties, blue and gold. The school's website contains its constitution. The school was recognized in 2008 for its parliament system in an article in Maclean's magazine which said, "Since 1947, the school has held monthly parliamentary sessions replete with parties and question periods. It's only an hour from Athens to Ottawa, but Athens high-schoolers don't have to go to the capital to understand our political system." The school is well known for its mathematics program.

Despite being a small school, it has provided its students with many opportunities to travel all over the world. In 2008, "ADHS visited Europe (France, Belgium, The Netherlands), New York, and British Columbia." The school has many clubs for students, such as work crew, global virtual classroom, formal, world issues, envirothon, tech, chess, mathematics and yearbook.

Christopher Perkins, the gold medal winner in the longbow category at the 2011 World Archery Championships in Turin, Italy, is a former student.

See also

List of high schools in Ontario

References

External links
 A.D.H.S school home page
 Parliament

High schools in Leeds and Grenville United Counties
Educational institutions established in 1876
1876 establishments in Ontario